Křelovice may refer to the following places in the Czech Republic:

 Křelovice (Pelhřimov District)
 Křelovice (Plzeň-North District)